Hilbert's theorem may refer to:
 Hilbert's theorem (differential geometry), stating there exists no complete regular surface of constant negative gaussian curvature immersed in 
 Hilbert's Theorem 90, an important result on cyclic extensions of fields that leads to Kummer theory
 Hilbert's basis theorem, in commutative algebra, stating every ideal in the ring of multivariate polynomials over a Noetherian ring is finitely generated
 Hilbert's finiteness theorem, in invariant theory, stating that the ring of invariants of a reductive group is finitely generated
 Hilbert's irreducibility theorem, in number theory, concerning irreducible polynomials
 Hilbert's Nullstellensatz, the basis of algebraic geometry, establishing a fundamental relationship between geometry and algebra
 Hilbert's syzygy theorem, a result of commutative algebra in connection with the syzygy problem of invariant theory

See also 
 List of things named after David Hilbert